Elosman Euller Silva Cavalcanti (born 4 January 1995), simply known as Euller, is a Brazilian footballer.

Club career
Born in São José de Piranhas, Paraíba, Euller graduated with Vitória's youth setup, after being released by Bahia. On 14 August 2013 he made his first team – and Série A – debut, starting in a 3–1 home win against Ponte Preta.

On 16 September 2013 Euller signed a new deal with Vitória, until the end of 2017.

Honours
Vitória
 Campeonato Baiano: 2013 , 2016 , 2017

References

External links
Vitória official profile 

1995 births
Living people
Sportspeople from Paraíba
Brazilian footballers
Association football defenders
Campeonato Brasileiro Série A players
Campeonato Brasileiro Série B players
J2 League players
Cypriot First Division players
Saudi Professional League players
Esporte Clube Vitória players
Avispa Fukuoka players
Al-Shabab FC (Riyadh) players
Centro Sportivo Alagoano players
Associação Ferroviária de Esportes players
AEL Limassol players
Brazil under-20 international footballers
Footballers at the 2015 Pan American Games
Pan American Games bronze medalists for Brazil
Pan American Games medalists in football
Expatriate footballers in Japan
Brazilian expatriate sportspeople in Japan
Expatriate footballers in Saudi Arabia
Brazilian expatriate sportspeople in Saudi Arabia
Expatriate footballers in Cyprus
Brazilian expatriate sportspeople in Cyprus
Medalists at the 2015 Pan American Games